Ruttledge is a surname. Notable people with the surname include:

Hugh Ruttledge (1884–1961), English civil servant and mountaineer
P. J. Ruttledge (1892–1952), Irish politician
Robert Francis Ruttledge (1899–2002), Irish ornithologist
Tara Ruttledge (born 1991), Irish camogie player

See also
Routledge (surname)